Jalangi River, is a branch of the Ganges river in Murshidabad and Nadia districts in the Indian state of West Bengal. It flows into the Bhagirathi river and strengthens its lower channel, the Hooghly.

The river below the point where the Jalangi meets the Ganges is known as Hooghly and the course above it from the point of its separation from the main flow of the Ganges to its confluence with the Jalangi, it is called Bhagirathi.

Ghurni, a neighbourhood of Krishnanagar, a centre for the production of clay dolls, often referred to as Krishnanagar clay dolls, is located on the banks of the Jalangi. Nabadwip, the birthplace of Chaitanya Mahaprabhu is located in the west bank of the united flow of river Jalangi and Bhagirathi. Mayapur is located at the confluence of the Jalanagi and Bhagirathi.

Etymology
The name Jalangi derives from two Bengali words Jal (Water) and Angi (who (female) possess body). ‘Jalangi’ is a Bengali word meaning ‘watery body’ or ‘the body is made of water’. However, the name ‘Jalangi’ has been derived from that very settlement ‘Jalangi’ in P.S. Jalangi of Murshidabad district, at which, the river would take-off its supply from river Padma (Majumder, 1995, p-37)

The course of the river
Jalangi is a moribund river of 233 km in length in the Bhagirathi-Hooghly basin.  The river is simultaneously a distributary of the river Padma and a tributary of the river Bhagirathi. The reach of 9.1 km from abandoned off-take at Char Madhubona near Gopalpur (Ghat) to Sialmari confluence at Kopila is erased out from the map of the region and 41.9 km from Sialmari confluence to Bhairab-Jalangi confluence at Moktarpur, though traceable but dead at present. The reach downstream to the Bhairab-Jalangi confluence up to Jalangi-Bhagirathi confluence at Swarupganj (182km) is being maintained by the base flow of seepage water, contribution of Bhairab, and other spills during two months of the rainy season. 

The Jalangi leaves the Ganges or Padma at the extreme north of the Nadia district at 24°05´26´´ N and 88°41´53´´ E and joins the river Bhagirathi at Swarupganj (23°24´42´´ N and 88°22´50´´ E), opposite Nabadwip, the birth-place of Sri Chaitanya.

1.  Offtake at Char-Madhubona               to   Sialmari Confluence at Kopila                9.10 km	(Untraceable)
2.  Sialmari Confluence at Kopila           to   Bhairab Confluence at Moktarpur              41.9 km   (Dead)
3.  Bhairab Confluence at Moktarpur         to   Suti Confluence at Bali-Tungi                42.7 km
4.  Suti Confluence at Bali-Tungi           to   Kalma Khal Confluence at Radhanagar          55.2 km
5.  Kalma Khal Confluence at Radhanagar     to   Bhagirathi-Jalangi Confluence at Swarupganj  84.1 km
Total length from Offtake at Char-Madhubona to   Bhagirathi-Jalangi Confluence at Swarupganj  233  km

Changes in the course of rivers
The Jalangi is a modern stream, but its age is not known. Apparently it opened up long after the Bhairab River ran as a strong stream in a south easterly direction. Although it is generally believed that the river has opened up within the last few hundred years, there is no direct evidence of this. It is shown in Van den Brouck's map.

The Bhairab once flowed from the Ganges, across the present beds of the Jalangi, and further eastwards towards Faridpur. The Bhairab is no more a very active river. The Mathabhanga is a younger stream than Jalangi and it was not till very recently that the river completed its junction with the Hooghly by adopting the Churni (now its lower reaches) for its main course. Earlier most of the water of the Mathabhanga ran off to the east down the Kumara, Chitra, Coboduk (Bhairab), and Ichamati, but all these escape routes have been shut off, except a small amount for the Ichamati.

The point to note is that while earlier the rivers in the region flowed in a south-easterly direction, but later some force pulled the Jalangi and the Mathabhanga in a south-westerly direction. The inference is that it occurred because of a local subsidence, which was active for some period prior to 1750 and which has since become inactive.

Erosion
Erosion of the banks is not only a problem for the more turbulent rivers such as Padma and Bhagirathi, but also comparatively smaller rivers such as Jalangi. In 2006,  the state government sanctioned Rs. 7 crore for anti-erosion work in the Jalangi River.

Bridge
At present, there are 3 complete road-bridges and 2 rail-bridges on the river Jalangi. Three incomplete road bridges are also waiting for completion. From upstream to downstream, those are-

 Karimpur-Bakshipur road bridge (incomplete) On Karimpur-Domkal Road, 

 Fazilnagar-Amtala road bridge (incomplete) On proposed Fazilnagar-Amtala Road
 Radhanagar-Patikabari road bridge On Radhanagar-Patikabari-Nawda-Amtala Road
 Dwijendralal Setu (দ্বিজেন্দ্রলাল সেতু), inaugurated by Honorable Pūrta & Ābāsana Minister Sri Jatin Chakraborty on 1st July 1979 On Palashipara-Tehatta Road,at Palashipara
 Dwijendra Setu (দ্বিজেন্দ্র সেতু), named by Honorable Pūrta & Sarak minister Sri Kshiti Goswami on 21st July 1995 On NH 12 formerly NH-34 at Krishnagar
 Proposed Road Bridge-II On NH-12 at Krishnagar
 Old Rail Bridge at Krishnagar On Sealdah-Lalgola Railway inaugurated in 1905
 New Rail Bridge at Krishnagar On Sealdah-Lalgola Railway at Krishnagar inaugurated in 2012

Bengali poetry

 The Jalangi is emotionally referred to by the modern Bengali poet Jibanananda Das in his poem abar asibo phire:

"abar asibo ami banglar nodi math khet bhalobeshe
jalangir dheuey bheja banglar e shobuj korun dangaey"
(When again I come, smitten by Bengal's rivers and fields, to this
Green and kindly land, Bengal, moistened by the Jalangi river's waves.)

 Lyricist Sagar Chattapadhyaya and folk singer Bablu Halder's song is well known regarding the Jalangi river.
Oo Amar Jalangi Nadi,
Tor Kolete Roilam Ami, Janamo Abodhi

Photo Gallery

References

Rivers of West Bengal
Rivers of India